LOFTI-1 was an American satellite which was launched in 1961 and operated by the United States Navy and Naval Research Laboratory. It was used to conduct research into the propagation of very low frequency radio signals in the ionosphere, and to investigate if these signals could be received by submarines. A 136.17 MHz transmitter was used for this investigation.

The launch of LOFTI-1 was conducted at 03:45 UTC on 22 February 1961, using a Thor DM-21 Ablestar rocket flying from Launch Complex 17B at the Cape Canaveral Air Force Station. It was a secondary payload aboard the rocket, with the primary payload being the Transit 3B prototype navigation satellite. The rocket and upper stage used had the serial numbers Thor 313 and Ablestar 007 respectively. The launch resulted in a partial failure, with the spacecraft being placed in a more eccentric orbit than planned, and failing to separate from the upper stage.

LOFTI-1 was a  spacecraft, which was powered by six groups of solar cells charging a nickel-cadmium battery. It had an orbital period of 96.4 minutes. Due to the low perigee of its orbit, LOFTI-1 decayed quickly, and reentered the atmosphere on 30 March 1961, less than 37 days after launch. Despite being in the wrong orbit and operating for less time than had been planned, some useful data was returned from the mission. Together with data returned by later satellites, the data returned by LOFTI-1 proved that very low frequency signals were not suitable for satellite communications with submarines.

References

Spacecraft launched in 1961
Partial satellite launch failures
Spacecraft which reentered in 1961